The Dream is the fourth album by English indie rock band alt-J, released on 11 February 2022 by Infectious Music and the Canvasback Music division of Atlantic Records. It was promoted with the single "U&Me", which was released alongside the album's announcement on 22 September 2021. The track listing for the album was also revealed on this date through publication Stereogum. "Get Better" was released as the album's second single on 3 November 2021 and was accompanied by a pixel-art music video. "Hard Drive Gold" was released as the album's third single on 5 January 2022. "The Actor" was released as the fourth single on 7 February 2022.

Artwork
The artwork for The Dreams cover is a drawing by the artist Joel Wyllie.

Critical reception

The album received a four-star rating from The Observer, who said it was a "stroll around the curiosity shop". In the same review the band's embrace of American sounds was noted.

Track listing

PersonnelAlt-J Joe Newman – vocals, guitar (all tracks), additional percussion (2)
 Thom Sonny Green – drums, percussion, programming (all tracks); additional percussion (2), spoken voice (12)
 Gus Unger-Hamilton – keyboards, synthesizer (all tracks); backing vocals (1, 3–12), organ (1, 2, 4, 6, 11), additional percussion (2), bass (3, 9, 11)Additional musicians David Force – bagpipes (1), crumhorn (1, 2)
 Reinoud Ford – cello (1, 2, 4, 5, 7–9)
 Will Gardner – conductor, string arrangement (1, 2, 4, 5, 7–9); backing vocals (9)
 Tim Rundle – crumhorn (1, 2)
 Andy Marshall – double bass (1, 2, 5, 7–9)
 Charlie Andrew – programming (all tracks), additional percussion (2)
 Highgate School Choir – vocals (1–3)
 Tyler DeFord – sound effects (2)
 Matthew Ward – violin (2, 4, 5, 7, 9)
 Ciaran McCabe – violin (2, 4, 5, 7, 9)
 Kirsty Mangan – violin (2, 4, 5, 7, 9)
 Anna Zara Newman – spoken voice (3)
 Cordelia Unger-Hamilton – spoken voice (3)
 April Unger-Hamilton – backing vocals (4, 5), spoken voice (6)
 Sarah Andrew – bassoon (4)
 Trevor Mires – trombone (6)
 Christie Valeriano – backing vocals (8)
 George Eddy – backing vocals (9)
 Andrew Cohen – sound effects (9)
 Arianna Cohen – spoken voice (9, 12)
 Matt Glasbey – spoken voice (11)
 Mark Newman – spoken voice (11)Technical'
 Charlie Andrew – production, mixing
 Dick Beetham – mastering
 Matt Glasbey – mixing, engineering (all tracks); additional production (1, 10)
 George Collins – engineering assistance (1, 3, 10–12)
 Katie Earl – engineering assistance (1–4, 9–12)

Charts

Weekly charts

Year-end charts

References

2022 albums
Alt-J albums
Infectious Music albums